Narendrapur Wildlife Sanctuary in South 24 Parganas District, West Bengal is an Orchard Plantation and constitutes only  and is rich in smaller birds, specially paradise flycatcher, oriole, etc.

References
 West Bengal Wildlife Sanctuaries

External links 

Wildlife sanctuaries in West Bengal
Geography of South 24 Parganas district
Tourist attractions in South 24 Parganas district
Lower Gangetic Plains moist deciduous forests
Protected areas with year of establishment missing